was the fifth shōgun of the Tokugawa dynasty of Japan. He was the younger brother of Tokugawa Ietsuna, as well as the son of Tokugawa Iemitsu, the grandson of Tokugawa Hidetada, and the great-grandson of Tokugawa Ieyasu.

Tsunayoshi is known for instituting animal protection laws, particularly for dogs. This earned him the nickname of "the dog shōgun". He had a dog named Takemaru.

Early years (1646–1680)

Tokugawa Tsunayoshi was born on February 23, 1646, in Edo. He was the son of Tokugawa Iemitsu by one of his concubines, named Otama, later known as Keishōin 桂昌院 (1627–1705). Tsunayoshi had an elder brother already five years old, who would become the next shogun after Iemitsu's death, Tokugawa Ietsuna. Tsunayoshi was born in Edo and after his birth moved in with his mother to her own private apartments in Edo Castle.  "The younger son (Tsunayoshi) apparently distinguished himself by his precociousness and liveliness at an early age, and the father, the third shogun, Iemitsu, became fearful that he might usurp the position of his duller elder brothers [and] thus he ordered that the boy (Tsunayoshi) not to be brought up  as a samurai/warrior, as was becoming for his station, but be trained as a scholar." His childhood name was Tokumatsu (徳松).

While his father was shōgun, his mother was an adopted daughter of the Honjō family, led by Honjō Munemasa (1580–1639) in Kyoto. His mother's natural parents were merchants in Kyoto. This remarkable woman was very close with Tsunayoshi in his young years, and while his older brother Ietsuna began to rely on regents for much of his reign, Tsunayoshi did exactly the opposite, relying on his remarkable mother for advice until her death.

In 1651, shōgun Iemitsu died when Tsunayoshi was only five years old. His older brother, Tokugawa Ietsuna, became shogun. For the most part, Tsunayoshi's life during the reign of his brother shōgun Ietsuna is unknown, but he never advised his brother.

Family
 Father: Tokugawa Iemitsu (徳川 家光, August 12, 1604 – June 8, 1651) 
 Mother: Otama no Kata (1627–1705) later Keishoin (桂昌院), Honjo Sonsei's daughter (本庄宗正)
 Wife: Takatsukasa Nobuko (1651–1709) later Jokoin, daughter of court noble  Takatsukasa Norihira
 Concubines:
 Oden no Kata (1658–1738) later Zuishun-in
 Yasuko no Kata (d. 1681) later Seichōin
 Lady Emonosuke (d. 1705)
 Lady Osuke (d. 1714) later Jukoin
 Lady Shinsuke later Sheishin-in
 Children:
 Tsuruhime (1677–1704) by Oden, married Tokugawa Tsunanori of Kii Domain
 Tokugawa Tokumatsu (1679–1683), Tatebayashi Domain by Oden
 Tokugawa Chomatsu (1681–1683) by Yasuko
 Adopted:
 Tokugawa Ienobu
 Kichihime (1697–1701) signed as Midaidokoro's daughter
 Yaehime (1689–1746) daughter of Takatsukasa Sukenobu, married Tokugawa Yoshizane of Mito Family later Yousen-in had 1 daughter, Miyohime married Tokugawa Munetaka signed as Midaidokoro's daughter
 Matsuhime daughter of Tokugawa Tsunanari married Maeda Yoshinori signed as Midaidokoro's daughter
 Takehime (1705–1772), daughter of Hirosada Seikan'in and adopted by Tokugawa Yoshimune and married Shimazu Tsugutoyo of Satsuma Domain and known as Joganin had 1 daughter, Kikuhime (1733–1808) signed as Midaidokoro's daughter and signed as Okume no Kata's daughter when she became adopted daughter of Yoshimune

Disputed succession (1680)
In 1680, shōgun Ietsuna died at the premature age of 38.

 June 4, 1680 (Enpō 8, 8th day of the 5th month): Shogun Ietsuna's death leads to the accession of Tsunayoshi as head of the shogunate.
 1680–81 (Enpō 8): Gokoku-ji in Edo is founded in honor of Tsunayoshi's mother.
 1681 (Tenna 1): Tsunayoshi's investiture as shōgun.

A power struggle ensued, and for a time, the succession remained an open question.  Sakai Tadakiyo, one of Ietsuna's most favored advisors, suggested that the succession not pass to someone of the Tokugawa line, but rather to the blood royal, favoring one of the sons of Emperor Go-Sai to become the next shōgun (as during the Kamakura shogunate) but Tadakiyo was dismissed soon after.

Hotta Masatoshi, one of the most brilliant advisors of shōgun Ietsuna's rule, was the first person to suggest that Tokugawa Tsunayoshi, as the brother of the former shōgun and the son of the third, become the next shōgun. Finally, in 1681 (Tenna 1), Tsunayoshi's elevation was confirmed; and he was installed as the fifth shōgun of the Tokugawa shogunate.

Shōgun (1680–1709)

Immediately after becoming shōgun, Tsunayoshi gave Hotta Masatoshi the title of Tairō, in a way thanking him for ensuring his succession. Almost immediately after he became shogun, he ordered a vassal of the Takata to commit suicide because of misgovernment, showing his strict approach to the samurai code. He then confiscated his fief of 250,000 koku. During his reign, he confiscated a total of 1,400,000 koku.

In 1682, shōgun Tsunayoshi ordered his censors and police to raise the living standard of the people. Soon, prostitution was banned, waitresses could not be employed in tea houses, and rare and expensive fabrics were banned. Most probably, smuggling began as a practice in Japan soon after Tsunayoshi's authoritarian laws came into effect. In 1684, Tsunayoshi also decreased the power of the tairō after the assassination of Masatoshi by a cousin in that same year.

Nonetheless, due again to maternal advice, Tsunayoshi became very religious, promoting the Neo-Confucianism of Zhu Xi. In 1682, he read to the daimyōs an exposition of the "Great Learning", which became an annual tradition at the shōguns court. He soon began to lecture even more, and in 1690 lectured about Neo-Confucian work to Shinto and Buddhist daimyōs, and even to envoys from the court of Emperor Higashiyama in Kyoto. He also was interested in several Chinese works, namely The Great Learning (Da Xue) and The Classic of Filial Piety (Xiao Jing). Tsunayoshi also loved art and Noh theater.

In 1691, Engelbert Kaempfer visited Edo as part of the annual Dutch embassy from Dejima in Nagasaki. He journeyed from Nagasaki to Osaka, to Kyoto, and there to Edo. Kaempfer gives us information on Japan during the early reign of Tokugawa Tsunayoshi. As the Dutch embassy entered Edo in 1692, they asked to have an audience with Shogun Tsunayoshi. While they were waiting for approval, a fire destroyed six hundred houses in Edo, and the audience was postponed. Tsunayoshi and several of the ladies of the court sat behind reed screens, while the Dutch embassy sat in front of them. Tsunayoshi took an interest in Western matters, and apparently asked them to talk and sing with one another for him to see how Westerners behaved. Tsunayoshi later put on a Noh drama for them.

Owing to religious fundamentalism, Tsunayoshi sought protection for living beings in the later parts of his rule. In the 1690s and first decade of the 1700s, Tsunayoshi, who was born in the Year of the Dog, thought he should take several measures concerning dogs. Therefore, he earned the pejorative title Inu-Kubō (犬公方: Inu=Dog, Kubō=formal title of Shogun).

In 1695, there were so many dogs that Edo began to smell horribly. An apprentice was even executed because he wounded a dog. Finally, the issue was taken to an extreme, as over 50,000 dogs were deported to kennels in the suburbs of the city where they would be housed. They were apparently fed rice and fish at the expense of the taxpaying citizens of Edo.

For the latter part of Tsunayoshi's reign, he was advised by Yanagisawa Yoshiyasu. It was a golden era of classic Japanese art, known as the Genroku era.

In 1701, Asano Naganori, the daimyō of Akō han, having been allegedly insulted by Kira Yoshinaka in Edo Castle, attempted to kill him. Asano was executed, but Kira went unpunished. Asano's forty-seven rōnin avenged his death by killing Kira and became a legend that influenced many plays and stories of the era. The most successful of them was a bunraku play called Kanadehon Chūshingura (now simply called Chūshingura, or "Treasury of Loyal Retainers"), written in 1748 by Takeda Izumo and two associates; it was later adapted into a kabuki play, which is still one of Japan's most popular.  The earliest known account of the Akō incident in the West was published in 1822 in Isaac Titsingh's book, Illustrations of Japan.

Tsunayoshi's first son Tokugawa Tokumatsu (1679–1683) died at the age of 4 due to illness. 

In 1683 Tsunayoshi's official wife, Takatsukasa Nobuko, poisoned Tsunayoshi's second son Chomatsu, who was his son with his favorite concubine, Yasuko. Chosomaru died at 3 years of age. This gave rise to suspicions that she may have poisoned Tokugawa Tokumatsu as well.

In 1704, Tsunayoshi's only surviving child, Tsuruhime died following a miscarriage and a few month after her husband, his son-in-law, Tokugawa Tsunanori of Kii Domain also died. Therefore, Tsunayoshi appointed his nephew, Tokugawa Ienobu, heir apparent in the winter of 1704. Ienobu was the son of his other brother, Tokugawa Tsunashige, the former Lord of Kōfu, which was a title Ienobu held himself before becoming shōgun. Ienobu moved into the official residence of Shogunal heir apparent at the Western Perimeter of Edo Castle.

In 1706, Edo was hit by a typhoon, and Mount Fuji erupted the following year.

Death
It was insinuated that Tsunayoshi was stabbed by his consort after he tried to proclaim an illegitimate child as his heir; this concept, stemming from the Sanno Gaiki, is refuted in contemporary records which explain that Tsunayoshi had the measles at the end of his life and died on February 19, 1709, in the presence of his entourage. His death was just four days short of his 63rd birthday. He was given the Buddhist name Joken'in (常憲院) and buried in Kan'ei-ji.

Eras of Tsunayoshi's bakufu
The years in which Tsunayoshi was shogun are more specifically identified by more than one era name or nengō.
 Enpō (1673–1681)
 Tenna (1681–1684)
 Jōkyō (1684–1688)
 Genroku (1688–1704)
 Hōei (1704–1711)

Ancestry

Notes

References

 Bodart-Bailey, Beatrice (2006). The Dog Shogun: The Personality and Policies of Tokugawa Tsunayoshi. Honolulu: University of Hawaii Press. ; ; .
 Bodart-Bailey, Beatrice (1999). Kaempfer's Japan: Tokugawa Culture Observed.  Honolulu: University of Hawaii Press. ; ; .
 Bodart-Bailey, Beatrice (1985). Monumenta Nipponica, Vol. 40, No. 2. .
 Nussbaum, Louis Frédéric and Käthe Roth. (2005). Japan Encyclopedia. Cambridge: Harvard University Press. ; .
 Screech, Timon (2006). Secret Memoirs of the Shoguns: Isaac Titsingh and Japan, 1779–1822. London: RoutledgeCurzon. ; .
 Titsingh, Isaac (1834). Nihon Ōdai Ichiran; ou, Annales des empereurs du Japon.  Paris: Royal Asiatic Society, Oriental Translation Fund of Great Britain and Ireland. .
 Totman, Conrad (1967). Politics in the Tokugawa Bakufu, 1600–1843. Cambridge: Harvard University Press. .

External links
 

|-

1646 births
1709 deaths
17th-century shōguns
18th-century shōguns
Tokugawa shōguns
Dogs in human culture